"Not Too Young to Get Married" is a song written by Phil Spector, Ellie Greenwich and Jeff Barry.  It was recorded at Gold Star Studios in Los Angeles in April 1963 by Bob B. Soxx and the Blue Jeans with the lead vocals by Bobby Sheen and Darlene Love.  The song was arranged by Jack Nitzsche, Larry Levine was the engineer and Spector's Wall of Sound was played by The Wrecking Crew.

The record was released later in 1963 as Philles Records 113 and peaked at #63 on the Billboard Hot 100.

Chart performance

Cover versions
The song's writers Greenwich and Barry released a version of the song by their group, The Raindrops, also in 1963, while Darlene Love released a 1985 version by 'Darlene Love and Girls."  The British pop group Racey included the song in their 1996 album "Lay Your Love On Me" after issuing it as a single in 1982.

References

1963 singles
1963 songs
Songs written by Phil Spector
Songs written by Jeff Barry
Songs written by Ellie Greenwich
Song recordings produced by Phil Spector
Song recordings with Wall of Sound arrangements
Philles Records singles
Bob B. Soxx & the Blue Jeans songs